

List
As of December 2019, Arkia operates to the following destinations:

References

Lists of airline destinations